Neil Joseph Krepela (born April 1947 in Omaha, Nebraska) is an American special effects artist and cinematographer.

He was nominated for two Academy Awards for Best Special Effects.

Life 
Neil Krepela was born in 1947 as son of Carl Charles Krepela (1905–1964) and Ruth Clarissa Krepela (Goodall, 1911–1983).

Krepelas father, who was an amateur photographer, sparked his interest in photography. When Krepela served in the US Navy, he started to photograph the places, he visited. He studied at the University of Nebraska and the Laney College. He later moved to the San Francisco Bay Area and started to shoot his own 16 mm films.

Krepela began his career in the movie industry in the 1970s. Richard Edlund engaged him as matte painting photographer for The Empire Strikes Back. Krepela worked at Industrial Light & Magic (ILM) on films such as Raiders of the Lost Ark, Dragonslayer, E.T. the Extra-Terrestrial, Star Trek II: The Wrath of Khan, Poltergeist, The Dark Crystal und Return of the Jedi. He later worked for Edlund's Boss Film Studios.

Krepela is married to Cristine Ackel and has two children from this marriage (born 2001, 2007). He has another daughter (born 1982) from his previous marriage.

Selected filmography 
 1980: The Empire Strikes Back
 1981: Raiders of the Lost Ark
 1981: Dragonslayer
 1982: E.T. the Extra-Terrestrial
 1982: Star Trek II: The Wrath of Khan
 1982: Poltergeist
 1982: The Dark Crystal
 1983: Return of the Jedi
 1983: The American Snitch
 1984: Ghostbusters
 1984: 2010: The Year We Make Contact
 1985: Fright Night
 1986: Desert Bloom
 1986: Poltergeist II: The Other Side
 1986: Legal Eagles
 1986: Big Trouble in Little China
 1986: The Boy Who Could Fly
 1986: Solarbabies
 1987: Masters of the Universe
 1987: The Monster Squad
 1987: Date with an Angel
 1988: Big Top Pee-wee
 1988: Vibes
 1989: Fletch Lives
 1989–1995: Tales from the Crypt (TV series, 5 episodes)
 1990: Solar Crisis
 1992: Batman Returns
 1993: Cliffhanger
 1993: Last Action Hero
 1994: True Lies
 1994: The Scout
 1994: The Specialist
 1995: Outbreak
 1995: Heat
 1996: Multiplicity
 2000: Dinosaur
 2000: The Fantasticks
 2002: Scooby-Doo
 2003: Terminator 3: Rise of the Machines
 2007: Meet the Robinsons
 2008: City of Ember

Award nominations 
 1985: nominated for an Academy Award for Best Special Effects, together with Richard Edlund, George Jenson and Mark Stetson for 2010: The Year We Make Contact
 1994: nominated for an Academy Award for Best Special Effects, together with John Richardson, John Bruno und Pamela Easley for Cliffhanger

References

External links 
 

1947 births
Special effects people
People from Omaha, Nebraska
Living people